Mario Sossi (6 February 1932 – 6 December 2019) was an Italian magistrate and politician. He was a prosecutor against members of the October 22 Group, and was captured by members of the Red Brigades on 18 April 1974 in Genoa. He was released on 22 May of the same year following a prisoner swap with the Italian government.

References

1932 births
2019 deaths
20th-century Italian politicians
People from Imperia